Cause for Divorce is a 1937 Czech-German comedy drama film directed by Karel Lamač and starring Anny Ondra, Jack Trevor and Robert Dorsay. It was Ondra's last film to be directed by Lamač.

Cast

References

Bibliography

External links 
 

1937 films
Czech comedy-drama films
Films of Nazi Germany
German comedy-drama films
1937 comedy-drama films
1930s German-language films
Films directed by Karel Lamač
German films based on plays
German black-and-white films
Czechoslovak black-and-white films
Czechoslovak comedy-drama films
1930s German films